Stanley Purl Menzo (born 15 October 1963) is a Dutch former professional footballer who played as a goalkeeper, and worked as a manager of Ajax Cape Town in the South African Premier Soccer League. He is currently the manager of Chinese Super League side Beijing Guoan.

Most of his professional career was spent at Ajax (ten full seasons), appearing in more than 300 official matches with the club and winning nine major titles.

Menzo represented the Netherlands national team in one World Cup and one European Championship.

Club career
Born in Paramaribo, Suriname, Menzo arrived at Eredivisie giants Ajax at the age of 19, from amateurs A.V.V. Zeeburgia.

After the two seasons 1983–84 and 1984–85 deputising for Hans Galjé, in which Menzo played only a few matches in April 1984, May 1985 and June 1985, and after a loan to fellow league side HFC Haarlem (September 1983 – March 1984), he became the starter for the 1985–86 campaign. Newly appointed manager Johan Cruyff believed that Menzo was one of the first goalkeepers who could also make his mark as a field player.

In the 1980s Menzo was subjected to racist abuse from fans.

Menzo then proceeded to remain an undisputed starter for seven full seasons, helping Ajax to the 1989–90 national title, as well as the 1986–87 European Cup Winners' Cup and the 1991–92 UEFA Cup. However, after a game in the latter competition the following season, a 4–2 loss at AJ Auxerre, during which he scored an own goal, he lost his place to youth graduate Edwin van der Sar, and never regained it.

In the 1994 summer, Menzo signed with PSV Eindhoven, where he backed up Ronald Waterreus for two seasons. The 33-year-old managed to revive his career in Belgium with Lierse SK, which he helped win one league and one cup, eventually amassing nearly 100 official appearances. For a brief period of time, he also played in France for Girondins de Bordeaux, arriving in August 1997 to replace Gilbert Bodart. However, having lost his place to Ulrich Ramé (who would be the club's first-choice for more than one decade), he returned to Lierse, in January 1998.

In the summer of 2001, after a second spell at Ajax, Menzo joined amateur club AGOVV Apeldoorn, helping it to the amateur title. He retired from football at the end of the season.

International career
Menzo gained six caps for the Netherlands, the first arriving in 1989. He then spent nearly three years without any further appearances, but was summoned for the squads present at both the 1990 FIFA World Cup and UEFA Euro 1992, as third-choice.

After legendary Hans van Breukelen retired from international play following the latter competition, Menzo was named the starter for the qualification stages of the 1994 World Cup; following two unassuming performances, the 1–2 loss in Norway and a 2–2 home draw against Poland, he was benched, and ultimately did not even made the squad at all (Ed de Goey, Theo Snelders and van der Sar would be the goalkeepers listed as starter, reserve and third respectively).

Managerial career
In the summer of 2004, after former Ajax teammate Marco van Basten became head coach of the national team, Menzo was named its goalkeeping coach, remained there for two years.

When coach Peter Bosz left in June 2002, Menzo became AGOVV's manager, remaining in the position for only one season: AGOVV became a professional club in the second division, but he did not have the qualifications to exercise in that category, subsequently moving to Amsterdam-based amateur club Amsterdamsche FC.

In February 2005, Menzo received the necessary diploma to coach professional clubs. That summer, he returned as head manager of AGOVV. A year later, he joined FC Volendam, lasting two seasons (incomplete) and signing with Cambuur Leeuwarden, which he led to the second position in the second level in 2009–10, even though the team ultimately failed in the playoffs.

In October 2010, Menzo resigned from his position at Cambuur in order to join Vitesse Arnhem as assistant to new head coach Albert Ferrer. In May 2013, he became the head coach of Lierse S.K., where he stayed until his sacking at the end of August 2014. On 28 October 2016, Menzo was appointed head coach of South African Premier Soccer League team, Ajax Cape Town. He left just before Christmas 2017.

On 14 January 2019, Menzo was appointed as the manager of the reserve team of Beijing Sinobo Guoan in China.

On 29 August 2022, Menzo was appointed as the manager for Beijing Guoan's first team.

Honours
Ajax
 UEFA Cup Winners' Cup: 1986–87
 UEFA Cup: 1991–92
 Eredivisie: 1984–85, 1989–90, 1993–94
 KNVB Cup: 1985–86, 1986–87, 1992–93, 1995–96

Lierse
 Belgian Pro League: 1996–97
 Belgian Cup: 1998–99

References

External links

Beijen profile 

1963 births
Living people
Sportspeople from Paramaribo
Dutch footballers
Netherlands international footballers
Surinamese footballers
Surinamese emigrants to the Netherlands
Association football goalkeepers
Eredivisie players
AFC Ajax players
HFC Haarlem players
PSV Eindhoven players
Belgian Pro League players
Lierse S.K. players
Ligue 1 players
FC Girondins de Bordeaux players
1990 FIFA World Cup players
UEFA Euro 1992 players
Dutch expatriate footballers
Expatriate footballers in Belgium
Expatriate footballers in France
Dutch expatriate sportspeople in Belgium
Dutch expatriate sportspeople in France
Dutch football managers
AGOVV Apeldoorn managers
Amsterdamsche FC managers
FC Volendam managers
SC Cambuur managers
Lierse S.K. managers
Ajax Cape Town F.C. managers
Beijing Guoan F.C. managers
UEFA Cup winning players
Association football goalkeeping coaches
Beijing Guoan F.C. non-playing staff